Emilio Serrano Jiménez (born 21 May 1950) is a Mexican politician affiliated with the Party of the Democratic Revolution. As of 2014 he served as Deputy of the LIX and LXI Legislatures of the Mexican Congress representing the Federal District.

References

1950 births
Living people
People from Mexico City
Members of the Chamber of Deputies (Mexico)
Party of the Democratic Revolution politicians
21st-century Mexican politicians